Kelsey Teneti (born 12 May 2003) is a New Zealand rugby union player and athlete.

Biography 
Teneti attended Hamilton Girls' High School. She was an age-grade hockey player and waka ama athlete. She plays for Waikato in the Farah Palmer Cup.

In 2021 Teneti was named in the Chiefs squad for their historic match against the Blues at Eden Park in April.

Teneti is contracted to the Black Ferns sevens team but is yet to make her sevens debut.

Teneti was called in as an injury cover for the Black Ferns squad for the 2022 Pacific Four Series. She made her international debut on 6 June 2022 against Australia at Tauranga.

References 

2003 births
Living people
New Zealand female rugby union players
New Zealand women's international rugby union players
People educated at Hamilton Girls' High School
Rugby union centres